Mal, also known as Thin, is a Mon–Khmer language of Laos and Thailand. It is one of several closely related languages which go by the names Thin or Prai.

Tayten (300 speakers as of 1995) is spoken in the 2 villages of Ban Phia and Ban Tenngiou in Pakxeng District, Luang Prabang Province, Laos. It is either Thin or Tai Then.

References

External links 
 http://projekt.ht.lu.se/rwaai RWAAI (Repository and Workspace for Austroasiatic Intangible Heritage)
 http://hdl.handle.net/10050/00-0000-0000-0003-8A2D-F@view T'in in RWAAI Digital Archive

Khmuic languages
Languages of Laos
Languages of Thailand